Gotell is a surname. Notable people with the surname include: 

Chelsey Gotell (born 1986), Canadian Paralympic swimmer
Walter Gotell (1924–1997), German actor

See also
Goell